Netu'a (lit. Planted) is a moshav in northern Israel. Located near the Lebanese border, it falls under the jurisdiction of Ma'ale Yosef Regional Council.

History
The village was established in 1966 by residents of other local moshavim as part of a plan to encourage more Jewish settlement in the Galilee. It is located on the land of the Palestinian villages of Dayr al-Qassi and Al-Mansura, both depopulated in the 1948 Arab–Israeli War.

References

Moshavim
Populated places established in 1966
Populated places in Northern District (Israel)
1966 establishments in Israel